IMT-2000 (International Mobile Telecommunications-2000)  is the global standard for third generation (3G) wireless communications as defined by the International Telecommunication Union.

In 1999 ITU approved five radio interfaces for IMT-2000 as a part of the ITU-R M.1457 Recommendation. The five standards are:

 IMT-2000 CDMA Direct Spread
 also known as W-CDMA, used in UMTS, the successor to GSM
 IMT-2000 CDMA Multi-Carrier
 also known as CDMA2000, the successor to 2G CDMA (IS-95)
 IMT-2000 CDMA TDD
 also known as TD-SCDMA
 IMT-2000 TDMA Single Carrier
 also known as EDGE, an intermediate 2.5G technology
 IMT-2000 FDMA/TDMA
 also known as DECT

To meet the IMT-2000 standards, a system must provide peak data rates of at 384 Kbit/s for mobile stations and 2 Mbit/s for fixed stations.

References

External links
 ITU-R Recommendation M.1457: Detailed specifications of the terrestrial radio interfaces of International Mobile Telecommunications-2000 (IMT-2000).
 ITU IMT-2000 Network Aspects

Mobile telecommunications standards
ITU-R recommendations